The Wangaratta Showgrounds is situated on the banks of the Ovens River, close to central Wangaratta and provides a large venue for a host of local sports and community clubs.

It has hosted the Wangaratta Agricultural Show since 1860 and the annual Wangaratta Athletic Carnival since 1917.

The sports oval is a major North Eastern cricket and football venue in Wangaratta, Victoria, Australia and is known as the Norm Minns Oval.

History

The first annual exhibition (Wangaratta Show) was hosted in 1860  by the Ovens and Murray Agricultural and Horticultural Association on land near the Ovens River, Wangaratta.

The Boxing Day Wangaratta Hospital Fete was first held at The Showgrounds in 1882, which also included an athletic program.

The first recorded international cricket match hosted on the ground came when Wangaratta played the touring Fijians in 1908.  The ground held its first first-class match in 1986 when Victoria played Queensland in the Sheffield Shield.  Ten years later a second first-class match was played there between Victoria and the West Indians.  A List A match was played there in the 2005/06 ING Cup between Victoria and New South Wales.

The Showgrounds Oval serves as a football ground in the winter. It is the home ground of the Wangaratta Football Club, Junior Magpies Football Club and the Murray Bushrangers Football Club and is one of the Ovens & Murray Football League's main two venues, alongside Lavington Sports Ground, Albury.

The venue also hosted two matches in the 2005 Australian Football International Cup.

The venue also has a bicycle track, and floodlighting suitable for night matches. The oval was renamed the Norm Minns Oval in honour of Norm Minns, who played in four consecutive O&MFL premierships with Wangaratta from 1949 to 1952, won another O&MFL flag as captain-coach of Benalla in 1953, and went on to the committees and selection boards for both the Wangaratta and the O&MFL interleague teams.

Notes
 1908 (first recorded international cricket match)
 Victoria: = 1986, 1996, 2006.

References

External links
The Showgrounds at ESPNcricinfo
The Showgrounds at CricketArchive

Cricket grounds in Australia
Sports venues in Victoria (Australia)
Sports venues completed in 1908
1908 establishments in Australia